Mario De Meo (born 8 September 1974) is an Italian former taekwondo practitioner. He competed in the men's 80 kg event at the 2000 Summer Olympics.

References

External links
 

1974 births
Living people
Italian male taekwondo practitioners
Olympic taekwondo practitioners of Italy
Taekwondo practitioners at the 2000 Summer Olympics
People from Formia
Sportspeople from the Province of Latina